Trierweiler is a municipality in Germany.

Trierweiler may also refer to:

 Valérie Trierweiler (born 1965), French journalist and former partner of François Hollande
 Ben Trierweiler, skier in the FIS Alpine World Ski Championships 2011 – Men's giant slalom

See also
 Dr. John Trierweiler House, in the National Register of Historic Places listings in Yankton County, South Dakota
 Trier, a city in Germany
 Weiler (disambiguation)

Disambiguation pages with surname-holder lists